Júlio Góes (born 25 October 1955, in Limeira) is a former professional tennis player from Brazil.

Career
Goes appeared in 15 Grand Slam main draws, without registering a win. He entered the singles, men's doubles and mixed doubles at the 1983 French Open, the only occasion he played in all three draws. In the singles he took the first two sets off Hans Gildemeister but ultimately lost the match, retiring at 5-6 down in the fifth. He also came close to a second round appearance at the 1983 US Open when he again couldn't take advantage of winning the first two sets, against Hans Simonsson.

He was the runner-up Bahia in 1983 and made the quarter-finals of the 1987 Guarujá Open, both times in the singles. As a doubles player his best result was finishing runner-up with partner Ney Keller at Viña del Mar in 1983. He was also a doubles semi-finalist at Bahia in 1983 and Palermo in 1986.

The Brazilian represented his country at the Davis Cup in two ties. He won a singles rubber against Bolivia's Oscar Chiarella and played two further singles matches in 1985, both of which he lost, to Mexicans Leonardo Lavalle and Francisco Maciel.

Grand Prix career finals

Singles: 1 (0–1)

Doubles: 1 (0–1)

Challenger titles

Singles: (5)

Doubles: (2)

References

1955 births
Living people
Brazilian male tennis players
People from Bauru
Sportspeople from São Paulo (state)